The Comanche are a Native American ethnic group.

Comanche or Commanche may also refer to:
 Comanche language, a Uto-Aztecan language spoken by the Comanche people

Aircraft 
 Piper PA-24 Comanche, a single-engined monoplane
 Piper PA-30 Twin Comanche, a twin-engined monoplane
 Piper PA-39 Twin Comanche C/R, a PA-30 Twin Comanche variant with counter-rotating engines
 Boeing–Sikorsky RAH-66 Comanche, a military helicopter developed but cancelled before service

Comics 
 Comanche (comics), a character in the Marvel Universe
 Comanche (comic book series), by Greg and Hermann Huppen

Film and television 
 Comanche (1956 film), directed by George Sherman
 Comanche (2000 film), written and directed by Burt Kennedy
 "Comanche", a 1959 episode of the Have Gun – Will Travel TV series
 Marty Comanche, a character on The Spoils of Babylon

Horses 
 Comanche (horse) (died 1891), reputed to be the only survivor of General George Armstrong Custer's detachment
 Commanche Court (1993–2009), an Irish Thoroughbred racehorse, sired by Comanche Run
 Commanche Run (1981–2005), a British Thoroughbred racehorse

Music 
 "Comanche", a 1959 instrumental by Link Wray
 "Comanche (The Brave Horse)", a 1960 song by Johnny Horton
 "Comanche", a 1961 song by The Revels
 "Comanche", a song from the 1971 album Negro é Lindo by Jorge Ben
 "Comanche", a song from the 1994 album Motorcade of Generosity by Cake
 "Comanche," a song from the 2012 album Blood by In This Moment
 Cesar Comanche, an American hip hop artist

Places

Bolivia 
 Comanche, Bolivia
 Comanche Municipality

Greenland 
 Comanche Bay

United States 
 Comanche County, Kansas
 Comanche Township, Barton County, Kansas
 Comanche, Montana
 Comanche, Oklahoma
 Comanche County, Oklahoma
 Comanche Point (Grand Canyon), a summit in Arizona
 Comanche, Texas
 Comanche County, Texas

Other uses 
 Comanche (video game series), computer games featuring the RAH-66 Comanche helicopter
 Comanche: Maximum Overkill, the first game in the series
 Jeep Comanche, a pickup truck
 Wycombe Comanche, once mascot of Wycombe Wanderers Football Club
 Comanche (yacht), Racing sail boat

See also 
 Comanche Territory (disambiguation)
 Comanchero (disambiguation)